The events of 1991 in anime.

Accolades
Animation Film Award: Roujin Z

Releases

Film 
A list of anime that debuted in theaters between January 1 and December 31, 1991.

TV series 
A list of anime television series that debuted between January 1 and December 31, 1991.

OVA releases 
A list of original video animations that debuted between January 1 and December 31, 1991.

See also 
1991 in animation

References

External links 
Japanese animated works of the year, listed in the IMDb

Anime
Anime
Years in anime